Gustavus Katterfelto (or Katerfelto) (c. 1743–1799) was a Prussian conjurer, scientific lecturer, and quack.

Career
Christian William Anthony Katterfelto (known as Gustavus) arrived at Hull in September 1776 and traveled around Britain until his death in 1799. He performed in London from 1780-84. The widespread flu epidemic of 1782 made him famous as a quack, when he used a solar microscope to show images of microbes he believed were its cause. These "insects" provided him with the catchphrase "Wonders! Wonders! Wonders!" which often headed his advertisements. He lectured in Piccadilly on electricity, magnetism and the invented terms "styangraphy, palenchics, and caprimantic arts" to impress his audience.

Katterfelto was an accomplished conjurer, who performed with a black cat which he advertised as "evil". He claimed to have launched the first hot air balloon fifteen years before the Montgolfier brothers, and claimed to be the greatest natural philosopher since Isaac Newton.

He performed on several occasions for the Royal family. The poet William Cowper refers to Katterfelto in The Task.

Katterfelto died in 1799 in Bedale, North Yorkshire where he is buried.

References

Further reading
 . 
 Frost, Thomas. (1876). The Lives of the Conjurors. Tinsley.
 Houdini, Harry. (1918). Doctor Katterfelto: One of the Most Interesting Characters in the History of Magic. Magician, Quack Doctor, Pseudo-Philosopher. M-U-M, vol.8 no.69, November 1918. Collected in "Houdini On Magic". 
 Paton-Williams, David. (2008). Katterfelto: Prince of Puff. Troubador Publishing. 
 Williams, Neville. (1962). Rogues and Rascals in English History. Collier Books.

External links
 Katterfelto and his Black Cat at The Great Cat

Attribution

1799 deaths
1740s births
18th-century Prussian people
British fraudsters
Prussian magicians